Victor Alexander Cooke, Baron Cooke of Islandreagh, OBE, DL (18 October 1920 – 13 November 2007), was an Ulster Unionist Party politician in Northern Ireland.

The son of Victor and Alice Cooke, he was educated in Marlborough College and graduated from Trinity College, Cambridge with a Master of Arts in mechanical science. He served as a Royal Navy lieutenant between 1940 and 1946. He was chairman of Henry R Ayton Ltd, Belfast, between 1946 and 1989.

Cooke was chairman of the Belfast Savings Bank in 1963 and of Harland and Wolff (1970–1987). Lord Cooke was Director of Northern Ireland Airports from 1970 to 1985. He was a Senator in the former Parliament of Northern Ireland from 1961 to 1968 and was the last member to remain politically active. In 1973, he was appointed High Sheriff of Antrim.

Cooke became a deputy lieutenant of County Antrim in 1971 and was invested as an officer of the Order of the British Empire in 1981. He was created a life peer as Baron Cooke of Islandreagh, of Islandreagh in the County of Antrim, on 11 August 1992.

He married Alison Sheila Casement (daughter of Maj-Gen Francis Casement) in 1951 and had two sons (Michael John Alexander (b. 1955) and James Victor Francis (b. 1960)) and one daughter (Victoria Sally (b. 1956), now The Hon. Mrs Nicholas Yonge). Lord Cooke of Islandreagh died following a long illness, aged 87.

See also
 List of Northern Ireland Members of the House of Lords

References

External links
Northern Ireland Senate, 1921-72

 

1920 births
2007 deaths
Ulster Unionist Party members of the Senate of Northern Ireland
Alumni of Trinity College, Cambridge
High Sheriffs of Antrim
Members of the Senate of Northern Ireland 1961–1965
Members of the Senate of Northern Ireland 1965–1969
Officers of the Order of the British Empire
People educated at Marlborough College
People from County Antrim
Royal Navy officers
Royal Navy officers of World War II
Deputy Lieutenants of Antrim
Cooke of Islandreagh
Ulster Unionist Party life peers
Life peers created by Elizabeth II